Arthur Hanse (born 10 February 1993 in Paris, France) is an alpine skier competing for Portugal. He competed for Portugal at the 2014 Winter Olympics in the slalom and giant slalom. Hanse is the son of emigrants from Portugal who now live in France, which allows him to compete for the country. Hanse originally competed for his native France until November 2013.

References 

1993 births
Living people
Portuguese male alpine skiers
Olympic alpine skiers of Portugal
Alpine skiers at the 2014 Winter Olympics
Alpine skiers at the 2018 Winter Olympics
French people of Portuguese descent
Sportspeople from Paris
Université Savoie-Mont Blanc alumni